Zoila V. Martínez Guante is a lawyer, prosecutor and diplomat from the Dominican Republic.

Martínez Guante graduated as Juris Doctor in 1967.

Martínez was prosecutor attorney of the National District, and ambassador to the Republic of Korea (South Korea). As prosecutor, she was part of the investigation team that probed the murder of José Rafael Llenas Aybar in 1996. She was the Ombudsman of the Dominican Republic from 29 May 2013 to 14 June 2021 when she was succeeded by Pablo Ulloa.

Martínez has been awarded by the Republic of Korea with the Order of Diplomatic Service Merit's Gwanghwa Medal, and by her own country with the Order of Merit of Duarte, Sánchez and Mella's Grand Cross with Silver Breast Star.

See also 
 List of first women lawyers and judges in North America

References 

Living people
People from Santo Domingo
Ambassadors of the Dominican Republic to South Korea
21st-century Dominican Republic women politicians
21st-century Dominican Republic politicians
Social Christian Reformist Party politicians
Grand Crosses with Silver Breast Star of the Order of Merit of Duarte, Sánchez and Mella
Dominican Republic women lawyers
Ombudsmen
1941 births
Dominican Republic women ambassadors
20th-century Dominican Republic lawyers
21st-century Dominican Republic lawyers